RMMV is an acronym for the following companies:

Rheinmetall MAN Military Vehicles
Royal Mail Motor Vessel
Remote Multi Mission Vehicle, an unmanned, autonomous, semi-submersible system used by the US Navy to detect underwater mines.
RPG Maker MV, the version of RPG Maker released in 2015.